Jaynee LaVecchia (born October 9, 1954) is a former associate justice of the Supreme Court of New Jersey. She was nominated by Governor Christine Todd Whitman to serve on the court on January 6, 2000 and was confirmed by the New Jersey Senate on January 10, 2000. In 2007, she was reappointed with tenure by Governor Jon Corzine. Although she could have served until reaching the mandatory retirement age in 2024, LaVecchia has announced her intention to retire from the Court effective December 31, 2021, unless her successor was confirmed earlier.

Biography
Jaynee LaVecchia was born in Paterson, New Jersey on October 9, 1954. She is a 1976 graduate of Douglass College and graduated in 1979 from Rutgers School of Law – Newark. She has been a member of the New Jersey State Bar Association since 1980. She was in private practice and worked as Director of the Division of Law within the Department of Law and Public Safety since August 1, 1984. As director, she was responsible for the legal work of all lawyers assigned to the civil side of the New Jersey Attorney ’s Office.

LaVecchia served in the Office of Counsel to Republican Governor Thomas Kean from 1986 to 1989, first as an Assistant Counsel and then as Deputy Chief Counsel. She was Director and Chief Administrative Law Judge for the Office of Administrative Law from 1989 through July 1994. In 1996, she was elected a Fellow of the American Bar Association. On August 24, 1998, LaVecchia became Commissioner of the New Jersey Department of Banking and Insurance.

LaVecchia was nominated by Governor Christine Todd Whitman to serve on the Supreme Court on December 24, 1999. She was confirmed by the Senate on January 10, 2000 and sworn in for a term to begin February 1, 2000. She replaced Marie L. Garibaldi. Governor Jon Corzine reappointed her to the New Jersey Supreme Court in 2006. She has chaired or served on various Supreme Court Committees, subcommittees, and other Court-assigned projects. She has been granted tenure until October 9, 2024.

Decisions

2008–09 Term
Education Law Center v. N.J. Department of Education
IMO Civil Commitment of J.M.B.
Piermount Iron Works, Inc. v. Evanston Insurance Co.
State v. Reeds
State v. Smith

2007–08 Term
Board of Education of the City of Sea Isle City v. Kennedy
Cutler v. Dorn
Godfrey v. Princeton Theological Seminary
Hunterdon Medical Center v. Twp. of Readington
In re Application of Virtua-West Jersey Hospital Voorhees for a Certificate of Need
Jablonowska v. Suther
Rutgers Casualty Insurance Co. v. LaCroix
State v. Burr
State v. Hamilton
State v. Wilder
Tarr v. Bob Ciasulli's Mack Auto Mall, Inc.

2006–07 Term
D'Annunzio v. Prudential Insurance Co.
Davidson v. Slater
IMO Tammy Herrmann
Phillips v. Gelpke
State v. Dispoto
State v. Fleischman
State v. Romero
State v. Williams – Evidence suggesting Jayson Williams' consciousness of guilt in shooting death of Gus Christofi was admissible at trial.
Stomel v. City of Camden

2005–06 Term
Delta Funding Corp. v. Harris
In re NJPDES Permit No. NJ0025241
Gazis v. Miller
Muhammad v. County Bank of Rehoboth Beach, Delaware
Olivo v. Owens-Illinois, Inc.
State v. Boretsky
State v. Chapland
State v. Pierce
State v. Thomas
State v. Nesbitt
Thomsen v. Mercer-Charles

2004–05 Term
DKM Residential Properties Corp. v. Township of Montgomery
Gerety v. Atlantic City Hilton Casino
Hennessey v. Winslow Township
H.K. v. N.J. Department of Human Services
Pinto v. N.J. Manufacturers Insurance Co.
Shankman v. State
State v. Benthall
State v. B.H.
State v. Brennan
State v. Harris
State v. Johnson
Thiedemann v. Mercedes-Benz, U.S.A., LCC
Township of Monroe v. Gasko
Yurick v. State

2003–04 Term
Camden Bd. of Education v. Alexander
Galvao v. G.R. Robert Construction Co.
N.J. Manufacturers Insurance Co. v. Hardy
State v. Banko
State v. Brannon
State v. Cassidy
State v. Cook
State v. Negran
State v. Pena
State v. P.H.
State v. Reiner
Varsolona v. Breen Capital Services Corp.
Weishaus v. Weishaus

2002–03 Term
D.L. Real Estate Holdings, LLC v. Point Pleasant Beach Planning Board
McCurrie v. Town of Kearny
McDevitt v. Bill Good Builders
Nisivoccia v. Glass Gardens, Inc.
Palisades Safety & Insurance Association v. Bastien
Silvestri v. Optus Software, Inc.
State v. Pelham
State in the Interest of S.G.
Warren County Community College v. Warren County Board of Chosen Freeholders

2001–02 Term
County of Camden v. Public Employees Retirement System
Erny v. Estate of Antoinette T. Merola
Gaines v. Bellino
Howard v. University of Medicine & Dentistry of N.J.
IMO the Commitment of W.Z.
Martindale v. Sandvik, Inc.
Merlino v. Borough of Midland Park
Shelcusky v. Garjulio
State v. Allah
State v. Josephs
State v. McCloud
State v. Joel Williams
State v. Edmond Williams
Weinberg v. Sprint Corp.

2000–01 Term
Fink v. Thompson
IMO Registrant J.M.
IMO Registrant M.F.
Lamorte Burns & Co., Inc. v. Walters
McGrogan v. Till
Pheasant Bridge Corp. v. Twp of Warren
Riding v. Towne Mills Craft Centre, Inc.
State in the Interest of T.M.
Schick v. Ferolito
State v. Fowlkes
State v. Hackett
State v. R.D.
State v. Whaley
Wilson v. Amerada Hess Corp.

1999–2000 Term
Crews v. Crews
IMO the Grant of the Charter School Application of Englewood on the Palisades Charter School
James v. Public Employees' Retirement System
Kaufman v. i-Stat Corp.
State v. Harris

References

External links
Justice Jaynee LaVecchia

1954 births
Living people
American people of Italian descent
Rutgers School of Law–Newark alumni
Justices of the Supreme Court of New Jersey
Politicians from Paterson, New Jersey
Rutgers University alumni
State cabinet secretaries of New Jersey
21st-century American judges
21st-century American women judges
20th-century American women judges
20th-century American judges